Kieler Förde is an approximately  long inlet of the Baltic Sea on the eastern side of Schleswig-Holstein, Germany. Formed by glacial movement during the last ice age, it divides Danish Wold peninsula from Wagria. Like the other inlets of förde-type, geologically it is not a fjord. It originates at the Hörn in centre-city Kiel and merges into the Bay of Kiel.

The eastern terminus of the Kiel Canal is located along Kiel Förde leading into the Port of Kiel. At its narrowest point, the "Friedrichsorter Enge", the fjord is only one kilometre wide. The Schwentine enters Kieler Förde near Kiel-Dietrichsdorf.

Locations 
Locations along the Kieler Förde:

Western shore 
From north to south:
 Bülk (Bülk Lighthouse)
 Strande (fishery and sporting harbor)
 Kiel-Schilksee (Olympic harbor)
 Falckenstein (Kiel's duty-free beach)
 Kiel-Friedrichsort (traditionsreicher Industriestandort)
 Kiel-Holtenau (Kiel Canal)
 Kiel-Wik
 Kiel-Düsternbrook
 Kiel-Zentrum (offices of the large Scandinavian cruise ships)

Eastern shore 
From south to north:
 Kiel-Gaarden (Howaldtswerke-Deutsche Werft
 Kiel-Ellerbek (former fishing village, now Arsenal)
 Kiel-Wellingdorf (southern mouth of the Schwentine)
 Neumühlen-Dietrichsdorf (trade harbour "Ostuferhafen")
 Mönkeberg
 Kitzeberg
 Heikendorf
 Möltenort (fishery and sport harbour)
 Laboe (vacation site, Laboe Naval Memorial, U-Boat, fishery, and two sport harbours)
 Stein in Probstei
 Wendtorf in Probstei (vacation site, large natural yacht harbor (Marina Wendtorf), fishing village)
 Heidkate

External links 
Webcam Kiel Data - Kieler Förde

Förden of Germany
Kiel
Bays of Schleswig-Holstein